The 2019 Supercopa Uruguaya was the second edition of the Supercopa Uruguaya, Uruguay's football super cup. It was held on 3 February 2019 between 2018 Torneo Intermedio winners Nacional and 2018 Primera División champions Peñarol.

The match was played at Estadio Centenario in Montevideo. Nacional won their first Supercopa title following a 1–1 draw with Peñarol after extra time and a 4–3 win on kicks from the penalty mark.

Teams

Match details

References

2019 in Uruguayan football
Supercopa Uruguaya
Supercopa Uruguaya 2019
Supercopa Uruguaya 2019
Supercopa Uruguaya 2019
February 2019 sports events in South America